Frank Glassman (May 14, 1908 – August 1, 1996) was an American football and basketball player. He played college football for Wilmington and Bliss College of Columbus, Ohio. He also played college basketball for Bliss College and the University of Detroit.  In 1929, he played professional football in the National Football League (NFL) as a guard and tackle for the Buffalo Bisons. He appeared in nine NFL games, five as a starter.

References

1908 births
1996 deaths
Buffalo Bisons (NFL) players
Players of American football from Ohio